Diogenes Laërtius was a biographer of the Greek philosophers. Nothing is definitively known about his life, but his surviving Lives and Opinions of Eminent Philosophers is a principal source for the history of ancient Greek philosophy. His reputation is controversial among scholars because he often repeats information from his sources without critically evaluating it. He also frequently focuses on trivial or insignificant details of his subjects' lives while ignoring important details of their philosophical teachings and he sometimes fails to distinguish between earlier and later teachings of specific philosophical schools. However, unlike many other ancient secondary sources, Diogenes Laërtius generally reports philosophical teachings without attempting to reinterpret or expand on them, which means his accounts are often closer to the primary sources. Due to the loss of so many of the primary sources on which Diogenes relied, his work has become the foremost surviving source on the history of Greek philosophy.

Life

Laërtius must have lived after Sextus Empiricus (c. 200), whom he mentions, and before Stephanus of Byzantium and Sopater of Apamea (c. 500), who quote him. His work makes no mention of Neoplatonism, even though it is addressed to a woman who was "an enthusiastic Platonist". Hence he is assumed to have flourished in the first half of the 3rd century, during the reign of Alexander Severus (222–235) and his successors.

The precise form of his name is uncertain. The ancient manuscripts invariably refer to a "Laertius Diogenes", and this form of the name is repeated by Sopater and the Suda. The modern form "Diogenes Laertius" is much rarer, used by Stephanus of Byzantium, and in a lemma to the Greek Anthology. He is also referred to as "Laertes" or simply "Diogenes".

The origin of the name "Laertius" is also uncertain. Stephanus of Byzantium refers to him as "Διογένης ὁ Λαερτιεύς" (Diogenes ho Laertieus), implying that he was the native of some town, perhaps the Laerte in Caria (or another Laerte in Cilicia). Another suggestion is that one of his ancestors had for a patron a member of the Roman family of the Laërtii. The prevailing modern theory is that "Laertius" is a nickname (derived from the Homeric epithet Diogenes Laertiade, used in addressing Odysseus) used to distinguish him from the many other people called Diogenes in the ancient world.

His home town is unknown (at best uncertain, even according to a hypothesis that Laertius refers to his origin). A disputed passage in his writings has been used to suggest that it was Nicaea in Bithynia.

It has been suggested that Diogenes was an Epicurean or a Pyrrhonist. He passionately defends Epicurus in Book 10, which is of high quality and contains three long letters attributed to Epicurus explaining Epicurean doctrines.  He is impartial to all schools, in the manner of the Pyrrhonists, and he carries the succession of Pyrrhonism further than that of the other schools. At one point, he even seems to refer to the Pyrrhonists as "our school." On the other hand, most of these points can be explained by the way he uncritically copies from his sources. It is by no means certain that he adhered to any school, and he is usually more attentive to biographical details.

In addition to the Lives, Diogenes refers to another work that he had written in verse on famous men, in various metres, which he called Epigrammata or Pammetros (Πάμμετρος).

Lives and Opinions of Eminent Philosophers

The work by which he is known, Lives and Opinions of Eminent Philosophers, was written in Greek and professes to give an account of the lives and sayings of the Greek philosophers.

Although it is at best an uncritical and unphilosophical compilation, its value, as giving us an insight into the private lives of the Greek sages, led Montaigne to write that he wished that instead of one Laërtius there had been a dozen. On the other hand, modern scholars have advised that we treat Diogenes' testimonia with care, especially when he fails to cite his sources: "Diogenes has acquired an importance out of all proportion to his merits because the loss of many primary sources and of the earlier secondary compilations has accidentally left him the chief continuous source for the history of Greek philosophy".

Organization of the work
Diogenes divides his subjects into two "schools" which he describes as the Ionian/Ionic and the Italian/Italic; the division is somewhat dubious and appears to be drawn from the lost doxography of Sotion. The biographies of the "Ionian school" begin with Anaximander and end with Clitomachus, Theophrastus and Chrysippus; the "Italian" begins with Pythagoras and ends with Epicurus.  The Socratic school, with its various branches, is classed with the Ionic; while the Eleatics and Pyrrhonists are treated under the Italic. He also includes his own poetic verse, albeit pedestrian, about the philosophers he discusses.

The work contains incidental remarks on many other philosophers, and there are useful accounts concerning Hegesias, Anniceris, and Theodorus (Cyrenaics); Persaeus (Stoic); and Metrodorus and Hermarchus (Epicureans). Book VII is incomplete and breaks off during the life of Chrysippus. From a table of contents in one of the manuscripts (manuscript P), this book is known to have continued with Zeno of Tarsus, Diogenes, Apollodorus, Boethus, Mnesarchus, Mnasagoras, Nestor, Basilides, Dardanus, Antipater, Heraclides, Sosigenes, Panaetius, Hecato, Posidonius, Athenodorus, another Athenodorus, Antipater, Arius, and Cornutus. The whole of Book X is devoted to Epicurus, and contains three long letters written by Epicurus, which explain Epicurean doctrines.

His chief authorities were Favorinus and Diocles of Magnesia, but his work also draws (either directly or indirectly) on books by Antisthenes of Rhodes, Alexander Polyhistor, and Demetrius of Magnesia, as well as works by Hippobotus, Aristippus, Panaetius, Apollodorus of Athens, Sosicrates, Satyrus, Sotion, Neanthes, Hermippus, Antigonus, Heraclides, Hieronymus, and Pamphila.

Oldest extant manuscripts
There are many extant manuscripts of the Lives, although none of them are especially old, and they all descend from a common ancestor, because they all lack the end of Book VII. The three most useful manuscripts are known as B, P, and F. Manuscript B (Codex Borbonicus) dates from the 12th century, and is in the National Library of Naples. Manuscript P (Paris) is dated to the 11th/12th century, and is in the Bibliothèque nationale de France. Manuscript F (Florence) is dated to the 13th century, and is in the Laurentian Library. The titles for the individual biographies used in modern editions are absent from these earliest manuscripts, however they can be found inserted into the blank spaces and margins of manuscript P by a later hand.

There seem to have been some early Latin translations, but they no longer survive. A 10th-century work entitled Tractatus de dictis philosophorum shows some knowledge of Diogenes. Henry Aristippus, in the 12th century, is known to have translated at least some of the work into Latin, and in the 14th century an unknown author made use of a Latin translation for his De vita et moribus philosophorum (attributed erroneously to Walter Burley).

Printed editions

The first printed editions were Latin translations. The first, Laertii Diogenis Vitae et sententiae eorum qui in philosophia probati fuerunt (Romae: Giorgo Lauer, 1472), printed the translation of Ambrogio Traversari (whose manuscript presentation copy to Cosimo de' Medici was dated February 8, 1433) and was edited by Elio Francesco Marchese. The Greek text of the lives of Aristotle and Theophrastus appeared in the third volume of the Aldine Aristotle in 1497. The first edition of the whole Greek text was that published by Hieronymus Froben in 1533. The Greek/Latin edition of 1692 by Marcus Meibomius divided each of the ten books into paragraphs of equal length, and progressively numbered them, providing the system still in use today.

The first critical edition of the entire text, by H.S. Long in the Oxford Classical Texts, was not produced until 1964; this edition was superseded by Miroslav Marcovich's Teubner edition, published between 1999 and 2002. A new edition, by Tiziano Dorandi, was published by Cambridge University Press in 2013.

English translations
Thomas Stanley's 1656 History of Philosophy adapts the format and content of Laertius' work into English, but Stanley compiled his book from a number of classical biographies of philosophers. The first complete English translation was a late 17th-century translation by ten different persons. A better translation was made by Charles Duke Yonge (1853), but although this was more literal, it still contained many inaccuracies. The next translation was by Robert Drew Hicks (1925) for the Loeb Classical Library, although it is slightly bowdlerized. A new translation by Pamela Mensch was published by Oxford University Press in 2018.

Legacy and assessment

Henricus Aristippus, the archdeacon of Catania, produced a Latin translation of Diogenes Laertius's book in southern Italy in the late 1150s, which has since been lost or destroyed. Geremia da Montagnone used this translation as a source for his Compedium moralium notabilium (circa 1310) and an anonymous Italian author used it as a source for work entitled Liber de vita et moribus philosophorum (written  1317–1320), which reached international popularity in the Late Middle Ages. The monk Ambrogio Traversari (1386–1439) produced another Latin translation in Florence between 1424 and 1433, for which far better records have survived. The Italian Renaissance scholar, painter, philosopher, and architect Leon Battista Alberti (1404–1472) borrowed from Traversari's translation of the Lives and Opinions of Eminent Philosophers in Book 2 of his Libri della famiglia and modeled his own autobiography on Diogenes Laërtius's Life of Thales. 

Diogenes Laërtius's work has had a complicated reception in modern times. The value of his Lives and Opinions of Eminent Philosophers as an insight into the private lives of the Greek sages led the French Renaissance philosopher Michel de Montaigne (1533–1592) to exclaim that he wished that, instead of one Laërtius, there had been a dozen. Georg Wilhelm Friedrich Hegel (1770–1831) criticized Diogenes Laërtius for his lack of philosophical talent and categorized his work as nothing more than a compilation of previous writers' opinions. Nonetheless, he admitted that Diogenes Laërtius's compilation was an important one given the information that it contained. Hermann Usener (1834–1905) deplored Diogenes Laërtius as a "complete ass" (asinus germanus) in his Epicurea (1887). Werner Jaeger (1888–1961) damned him as "that great ignoramus". In the late twentieth and early twenty-first centuries, however, scholars have managed to partially redeem Diogenes Laertius's reputation as a writer by reading his book in a Hellenistic literary context.

Nonetheless, modern scholars treat Diogenes's testimonia with caution, especially when he fails to cite his sources. Herbert S. Long warns: "Diogenes has acquired an importance out of all proportion to his merits because the loss of many primary sources and of the earlier secondary compilations has accidentally left him the chief continuous source for the history of Greek philosophy." Robert M. Strozier offers a somewhat more positive assessment of Diogenes Laertius's reliability, noting that many other ancient writers attempt to reinterpret and expand on the philosophical teachings they describe, something which Diogenes Laërtius rarely does. Strozier concludes, "Diogenes Laertius is, when he does not conflate hundreds of years of distinctions, reliable simply because he is a less competent thinker than those on whom he writes, is less liable to re-formulate statements and arguments, and especially in the case of Epicurus, less liable to interfere with the texts he quotes. He does, however, simplify."

Despite his importance to the history of western philosophy and the controversy surrounding him, according to Gian Mario Cao, Diogenes Laërtius has still not received adequate philological attention. Both modern critical editions of his book, by H. S. Long (1964) and by M. Marcovich (1999) have received extensive criticism from scholars.

He is criticized primarily for being overly concerned with superficial details of the philosophers' lives and lacking the intellectual capacity to explore their actual philosophical works with any penetration. However, according to statements of the 14th-century monk Walter Burley in his De vita et moribus philosophorum, the text of Diogenes seems to have been much fuller than that which we now possess.

Reliability 
Although Diogenes had a will to objectivity and fact-checking, Diogenes's works are today seen as generally unreliable from a historical perspective. He is neither consistent nor reliable in some of his reports and some of the details he cites contain obvious errors. Some of them were probably introduced by copyists in the transmission of the text from antiquity, but some errors are undoubtedly due to Diogenes himself. The reliability of Diogenes' sources have also been questioned, since he uses comic poets as sources. Professor Brian Gregor suggests that readers will benefit from modern scholarly assistance while reading Diogenes' biographies, since they are "notoriously unreliable". Some scholars (e.g. Delfim Leão) state that Diogenes' unreliability is not entirely his responsibility and blame his sources instead.

Editions and translations 
 Diogenis Laertii Vitae philosophorum edidit Miroslav Marcovich, Stuttgart-Lipsia, Teubner, 1999–2002. Bibliotheca scriptorum Graecorum et Romanorum Teubneriana, vol. 1: Books I–X ; vol. 2: Excerpta Byzantina; v. 3: Indices by Hans Gärtner.
 Lives of Eminent Philosophers, edited by Tiziano Dorandi, Cambridge: Cambridge University Press, 2013 (Cambridge Classical Texts and Commentaries, vol. 50, new radically improved critical edition).
 

 Translation by R.D. Hicks:
 
 
 
 Translations based on the critical edition by Tiziano Dorandi:

See also
 Mochus

Notes

References

Further reading
Barnes, Jonathan. 1992. "Diogenes Laertius IX 61–116: The Philosophy of Pyrrhonism." In Aufstieg und Niedergang der römischen Welt: Geschichte und Kultur Roms im Spiegel der neueren Forschung. Vol. 2: 36.5–6. Edited by Wolfgang Haase, 4241–4301. Berlin: W. de Gruyter.
 Barnes, Jonathan. 1986. "Nietzsche and Diogenes Laertius." Nietzsche-Studien 15:16–40.
 Dorandi, Tiziano. 2009. Laertiana: Capitoli sulla tradizione manoscritta e sulla storia del testo delle Vite dei filosofi di Diogene Laerzio. Berlin; New York: Walter de Gruyter.
 Eshleman, Kendra Joy. 2007. "Affection and Affiliation: Social Networks and Conversion to Philosophy." The Classical Journal 103.2: 129–140.
 Grau, Sergi. 2010. "How to Kill a Philosopher: The Narrating of Ancient Greek Philosophers' Deaths in Relation to the Living. Ancient Philosophy 30.2: 347-381
 Hägg, Tomas. 2012. The Art of Biography in Antiquity. Cambridge, UK: Cambridge Univ. Press.
 Kindstrand, Jan Frederik. 1986. "Diogenes Laertius and the Chreia Tradition." Elenchos 7:217–234.
 Long, Anthony A. 2006. "Diogenes Laertius, Life of Arcesilaus." In From Epicurus to Epictetus: Studies in Hellenistic and Roman Philosophy. Edited by Anthony A. Long, 96–114. Oxford: Oxford Univ. Press.
 Mansfeld, Jaap. 1986. "Diogenes Laertius on Stoic Philosophy." Elenchos 7: 295–382.
 Mejer, Jørgen. 1978. Diogenes Laertius and his Hellenistic Background. Wiesbaden: Steiner.
 Mejer, Jørgen. 1992. "Diogenes Laertius and the Transmission of Greek Philosophy." In Aufstieg und Niedergang der römischen Welt: Geschichte und Kultur Roms im Spiegel der neueren Forschung. Vol. 2: 36.5–6. Edited by Wolfgang Haase, 3556–3602. Berlin: W. de Gruyter.
 Morgan, Teresa J. 2013. "Encyclopaedias of Virtue?: Collections of Sayings and Stories About Wise Men in Greek." In Encyclopaedism from Antiquity to the Renaissance. Edited by  Jason König and Greg Woolf, 108–128. Cambridge; New York: Cambridge University Press.
 Sassi, Maria Michela. 2011. Ionian Philosophy and Italic Philosophy: From Diogenes Laertius to Diels. In The Presocratics from the Latin Middle Ages to Hermann Diels. Edited by Oliver Primavesi and Katharina Luchner, 19–44. Stuttgart: Steiner.
 Sollenberger, Michael. 1992. The Lives of the Peripatetics: An Analysis of the Content and Structure of Diogenes Laertius’ “Vitae philosophorum” Book 5. In Aufstieg und Niedergang der römischen Welt: Geschichte und Kultur Roms im Spiegel der neueren Forschung. Vol. 2: 36.5–6. Edited by Wolfgang Haase, 3793–3879. Berlin: W. de Gruyter.
 Vogt, Katja Maria, ed. 2015. Pyrrhonian Skepticism in Diogenes Laertius. Tübingen, Germany: Mohr Siebeck.
 Warren, James. 2007. "Diogenes Laertius, Biographer of Philosophy." In Ordering Knowledge in the Roman Empire. Edited by Jason König and Tim Whitmars, 133–149. Cambridge; New York : Cambridge University Press.

Attribution:

External links

 Works by Diogenes Laertius at Perseus Digital Library
 
 
 
 
 Ancient Greek text of Diogenes's Lives
 Article on the Manuscript versions at the Tertullian Project
 A bibliography of the Lives and Opinions of Eminent Philosophers
 Libro de la vita de philosophi et delle loro elegantissime sentencie. Venice, Joannes Rubeus Vercellensis, 20 May 1489. From the Rare Book and Special Collections Division at the Library of Congress
 Digitized Manuscript of Diogenes Laertius' Vitae Philosophorum (Arundel MS 531) at the British Library website

3rd-century Romans
3rd-century Greek people
3rd-century philosophers
3rd-century writers
Ancient Greek biographers
Ancient Greek writers
Year of birth unknown
Year of death unknown
Quotation collectors
3rd-century books
Ancient Greek works
Books about philosophers